Neudenau is a town in the district of Heilbronn, Baden-Württemberg, Germany. It is situated on the river Jagst, 17 km north of Heilbronn.

References

Heilbronn (district)